Bubsy in: Claws Encounters of the Furred Kind, often shortened to Bubsy, is a platform game first released for the Sega Genesis and Super Nintendo Entertainment System by Accolade in 1993. It is the first entry in the Bubsy series of video games. The game's title is a play on words in reference to the film Close Encounters of the Third Kind, with the game revolving around Bubsy defending the planet's supply of yarn balls from alien invaders.

The game was ported to Windows in 1995 under the title Super Bubsy. A sequel, Bubsy 2, was released in 1994.

Gameplay 

In the game, enemy aliens called "Woolies" intend to steal Earth's supply of yarn balls. Since Bubsy has the world's largest collection of yarn balls, he has the most at stake and sets out to stop the Woolies and reclaim the yarn balls. The game plays as a 2D side-scrolling platformer. The player must maneuver Bubsy through the levels, jumping on Woolies, and collecting stray yarn balls (which earns the player an extra life if 500 are collected). The game consists of sixteen levels, and Bubsy starts off with nine lives. In general, the game's gameplay has been compared to the Sonic the Hedgehog games from the Genesis era.

Development 
Designer Michael Berlyn had previously designed adventure video games, such as Altered Destiny and Les Manley in: Search for the King, prior to his work on Bubsy. Eventually burning out on the genre, he came across the original Sonic the Hedgehog and ended up playing it 14 hours a day, for a whole week, in order to find inspiration to do his own take on it. Development of the game began in 1991. Earlier sketches show Bubsy wearing shoes which were omitted in the final design. The Genesis version, which was the first one being worked on, was to be released in late 1992 but Accolade's legal troubles with Sega caused the game to be delayed. After artists Beckett Gladney and Ken Macklin constructed the backgrounds and character animations respectively on a PC program, a group named Solid Software went on to program them for the Super NES.

Director John Skeel said in an interview that they want to create a game as fast as Sonic and as deep as Mario. They also planned the game to be easy to play but hard to master. He also had difficulty finding a good voice for the main character. After weeks of searching through voice talent tapes, Skeel received a call from Brian Silva who aided trying to find a suitable voice, until Skeel tried speeding up a recording of Silva's voice, which took inspiration from Looney Tunes characters like Daffy Duck and Bugs Bunny, and added to the end result of Bubsy's design. Bubsy's catchphrase, "What could possibly go wrong?", was derived from the development team's quip.

In December 1992, some children who reside near Accolade's office in San Jose, California, were invited to have pizza, soda, and to test play the game. The children were also asked to comment on the game's aspects. Their suggestion to add more secret paths was picked up, resulting in the inclusion of some underground tube ways in the first level.

A group of 20+ people worked on the game. During the programming of the game to the Super NES, one of the hazards in the game was catnip that could drive Bubsy mad. This was replaced with banana peels because of Nintendo's censorship policies. The game was developed and released concurrently for the Super NES and Genesis, with each version looking and sounding almost identical.

Promotion 

In January 1993 at the Consumer Electronics Show (CES) in Las Vegas, a Bubsy mascot leaped out of a sack to greet spectators.

Months after the game's release, a lottery was put up by Accolade and GamePro. Winners of the lottery would win a 6-day trip to tourist locations in California, receive $500 in cash, and meet the game's developers. Other prizes include a Bubsy plush and shirt.

In Spain, a contest of drawing Bubsy fanart was put up where the winners would receive a cap, a hairpin, a shirt, a cup, and a rain coat.

Re-releases 
The Super NES version was released in Japan under the title Yamaneko Bubsy no Daibōken. The release was mostly identical, except that Bubsy's voice clips and most of the in-game text were dubbed in Japanese.

In 1995, ATI Technologies ported the game to Windows 95, under the name Super Bubsy. It contained completely redrawn graphics, and, if the player collects all 20 hidden TVs, this unlocks the Bubsy cartoon pilot that was never picked up for further episodes.

The Super NES version was also re-released on Steam via emulation on December 17, 2015, as part of the Bubsy Two-Fur, a two games compilation which also includes the Super NES version of Bubsy 2.

Reception 

Pre-release anticipation for the game was very high, with the game receiving aggressive marketing regarding the game as the next Sonic the Hedgehog or Super Mario. Bubsy himself even won Electronic Gaming Monthly'''s "Most Hype for a Character of 1993". Andy Eddy highly praised the game's nonlinear level designs in VideoGames & Computer Entertainment, but criticized that Bubsy suffers from uncontrollable momentum. He also complained that the backgrounds often don't move enough to give the player a frame of reference when taking big leaps, and concluded: "Bubsys flaws don't kill it, because there's loads of fun in there, but they do bring it down a notch or two". GamePros Feline Groovy also considered the nonlinear levels to be a high point and the controls a low point, elaborating that "when [Bubsy] runs, he tends to keep on running, even when you're not pressing the control pad. This is an intentional feature of the controls, but it'll cost you a few lives and a lot of frustration until you get the hang of it, especially on the extra tiny levels". However, she praised the graphics and judged Bubsy to have more personality than Sonic the Hedgehog thanks to his charming animations and voice clips. She gave the game the maximum 5 out of 5 in every category except control, deeming it "a must for any gamer's library". GamePro gave the Genesis version 5 out of 5 in graphics and FunFactor, 4 out of 5 in sound, and 4.5 out of 5 in control. Brazilian magazine ProGames gave the Super NES version a happy face with an open mouth (the magazine's maximum rating) on all five categories. German magazine PC Games gave the Windows version 70% GameFan awarded Bubsy "Best New Character" for 1993. The game also won a Parents choice award for being fun but non-violent. Electronic Games listed the Genesis version as one of the platform's best action games, and the Super NES version as one of the best Super NES games.

Conversely, IGN, in a retrospective review, called the game "mediocre", calling it a "pale Sonic imitator" and criticizing the game's floaty, imprecise physics and odd level design, but praised the character design inspired by classic cartoons. Hardcore Gaming 101, also in retrospect, called it a "Sonic'' rip-off" and criticized the game's physics, collision detection and overall level design. They said the levels "...seem to lack structure and cohesion. As a result, stages that should be fun to explore are just monotonous because one part of the stage doesn't look any different from the other. And when they aren't tedious, they're confusing".

Notes

References

External links 

1993 video games
Accolade (company) games
Alien invasions in video games
Bubsy
Science fantasy video games
Sega Genesis games
Side-scrolling platform games
Single-player video games
Super Nintendo Entertainment System games
Video games developed in the United States
Video games set in amusement parks
Windows games